Paul Charlton is a software and hardware consultant in Silicon Valley. He was a pioneer in developing freeware and open source computer programs. He was the founder of C2B Technologies.

Timeline of notable technological contributions
1985 FastTerm - One of the earliest known Freeware and open-source programs for browsing and participating in online communities such as CompuServe, The Source, Delphi and Bulletin Board System networks which pre-dated the existence of the World Wide Web,.
1987 Myarc Disk Operating System (MDOS) - operating system for consumer oriented personal computer.
1987 Myarc 9640 Geneve - single-board consumer oriented personal computer.
1994 QuickTime - market leading multimedia presentation engine for Windows, Mac OS and other platforms.
1996 Carbon API for Mac OS - legacy application compatibility on Apple Computer's Darwin Kernel (derived from QTML authored for QuickTime).
 1996 Created a company named C Innovation which makes the student information system called Zangle.
1997 C2B Technologies, Inc - Founder and CTO of company which developed market leading Internet comparison shopping engine, company was acquired in 1998 by Inktomi, which was later acquired by Yahoo
1998 Java 2D - key contributor to graphics library  distributed by Sun Microsystems as part of its Java developer kits since 1998,.

Education
Charlton received a BS in the disciplines of Electrical, Computer, and Systems Engineering (ECSE) from RPI (Rensselaer Polytechnic Institute)

References

Citations

External links

Rensselaer Polytechnic Institute alumni
Living people
Year of birth missing (living people)